The 16th Annual Grammy Awards were held March 2, 1974, and were broadcast live on American television. They recognized accomplishments by musicians from the year 1973.

Award winners 

 Record of the Year
Joel Dorn (producer) & Roberta Flack for "Killing Me Softly With His Song"
 Album of the Year
Stevie Wonder (producer & artist) for Innervisions (award presented by Cher and Telly Savalas)
 Song of the Year
Charles Fox & Norman Gimbel (songwriters) for "Killing Me Softly With His Song" performed by Roberta Flack
 Best New Artist
Bette Midler

Children's

Best Recording for Children
Joe Raposo (producer) for Sesame Street Live performed by the Sesame Street cast

Classical

Best Classical Performance - Orchestra
Pierre Boulez (conductor) & the New York Philharmonic for Bartók: Concerto for Orchestra
Best Classical Vocal Soloist Performance
Edward Downes (conductor), Leontyne Price & the New Philharmonia Orchestra for Puccini: Heroines
Best Opera Recording
Tom Mowrey (producer), Leonard Bernstein (conductor), Marilyn Horne, Tom Krause, Adriana Maliponte, James McCracken 7 the Metropolitan Opera Orchestra & Chorus for Bizet: Carmen
Best Choral Performance, Classical (other than opera)
André Previn (conductor), Arthur Oldham (choirmaster) & the London Symphony Orchestra & Chorus for Walton: Belshazzar's Feast
 Best Classical Performance Instrumental Soloist or Soloists (with orchestra)
Georg Solti (conductor), Vladimir Ashkenazy & the Chicago Symphony Orchestra for Beethoven: Concerti (5) for Piano and Orchestra
Best Classical Performance Instrumental Soloist or Soloists (without orchestra)
Vladimir Horowitz for Horowitz Plays Scriabin
Best Chamber Music Performance
Gunther Schuller (conductor) & the New England Conservatory Ragtime Ensemble for Joplin: The Red Back Book
Album of the Year, Classical
Thomas Z. Shepard (producer), Pierre Boulez (conductor) & the New York Philharmonic for Bartók: Concerto for Orchestra

Comedy

Best Comedy Recording
Cheech and Chong for Los Cochinos

Composing and arranging

Best Instrumental Composition
Gato Barbieri (composer) for "Last Tango in Paris" performed by various artists
Album of Best Original Score Written for a Motion Picture or a Television Special
Neil Diamond (composer) for Jonathan Livingston Seagull performed by various artists
Best Instrumental Arrangement
Quincy Jones (arranger) for "Summer in the City" 
Best Arrangement Accompanying Vocalist(s)
George Martin (arranger) for "Live and Let Die" performed by Paul McCartney & Wings

Country

Best Country Vocal Performance, Female
Olivia Newton-John for "Let Me Be There"
Best Country Vocal Performance, Male
Charlie Rich for "Behind Closed Doors"
Best Country Vocal Performance by a Duo or Group
Rita Coolidge & Kris Kristofferson for "From the Bottle to the Bottom" 
Best Country Instrumental Performance
Steve Mandell & Eric Weissberg for "Dueling Banjos"
Best Country Song
Kenny O'Dell (songwriter) for "Behind Closed Doors" performed by Charlie Rich

Folk

Best Ethnic or Traditional Recording (including traditional blues)
Doc Watson for Then and Now

Gospel

Best Gospel Performance
Blackwood Brothers for Release Me (From My Sin)
Best Soul Gospel Performance
Dixie Hummingbirds for "Loves Me Like a Rock"
Best Inspirational Performance
The Bill Gaither Trio for Let's Just Praise the Lord

Jazz

Best Jazz Performance by a Soloist
Art Tatum for God Is in the House
Best Jazz Performance by a Group
Supersax for Supersax Plays Bird
Best Jazz Performance by a Big Band
Woody Herman for Giant Steps

Musical show

Best Score From the Original Cast Show Album
Stephen Sondheim (composer), Goddard Lieberson (producer) & the original cast (Glynis Johns, Len Cariou, Hermione Gingold, Victoria Mallory, Patricia Elliott & Teri Ralston) for A Little Night Music

Packaging and notes

Best Album Package
Wilkes & Braun (art director; Tom Wilkes and Craig Braun) for Tommy (rock opera) (1972 orchestral version) performed by the London Symphony Orchestra & Choir
Best Album Notes
Dan Morgenstern (notes writer) for God Is in the House performed by Art Tatum
Best Album Notes - Classical
Glenn Gould (notes writer) for Hindemith: Sonatas for Piano (Complete) performed by Glenn Gould

Pop

Best Pop Vocal Performance, Female
Roberta Flack for "Killing Me Softly With His Song"
Best Pop Vocal Performance, Male
Stevie Wonder for "You Are the Sunshine of My Life"
Best Pop Vocal Performance by a Duo, Group or Chorus
Gladys Knight & the Pips for "Neither One of Us (Wants to Be the First to Say Goodbye)"
Best Pop Instrumental Performance
Eumir Deodato for "Also Sprach Zarathustra (2001: A Space Odyssey)"

Production and engineering

Best Engineered Recording, Non-Classical
Malcolm Cecil & Robert Margouleff (engineers) for Innervisions performed by Stevie Wonder 
Best Classical Engineered Recording
Edward (Bud) T. Graham, Ray Moore (engineers), Pierre Boulez (conductor) & the New York Philharmonic for Bartók: Concerto for Orchestra

R&B

Best R&B Vocal Performance, Female
Aretha Franklin for "Master of Eyes"
Best R&B Vocal Performance, Male
Stevie Wonder for "Superstition"
Best R&B Vocal Performance by a Duo, Group or Chorus
Gladys Knight & the Pips for "Midnight Train to Georgia"
Best R&B Instrumental Performance
Ramsey Lewis for "Hang On Sloopy"
Best Rhythm & Blues Song
Stevie Wonder (songwriter) for "Superstition"

Spoken

Best Spoken Word Recording
Richard Harris for Jonathan Livingston Seagull

References

External links
The 16th Grammy Awards, at the Internet Movie Database

 016
1974 in California
1974 music awards
1974 in Los Angeles
1974 in American music
Grammy
March 1974 events in the United States